The 1963 Copa de Campeones de América was the fourth season of South America's premier club football tournament. Nine teams entered with Bolivia and Venezuela not sending a representative.

This competition was notable for the participation of many world class stars such as José Sanfilippo, Pelé, Garrincha, Antonio Rattín, Alberto Spencer, Jairzinho, among others. The Alvinegro da Vila, usually regarded as the greatest football club team ever, defeated their semifinal and final opponents in stylish fashion which included a 0–4 victory over Botafogo in the fable Estádio do Maracanã, and a 1–2 win in La Bombonera, home of Boca Juniors. In a classic South American match-up, defending champions Santos defeated the Xeneixes on both legs of the final to retain the title.

Qualified teams

Format and tie-breaking criteria
Due to the uneven number of teams, the first round became a group stage with two groups of three and one group of two. The format for the semifinals and the finals remained the same as the previous season.

At each stage of the tournament teams receive 2 points for a win, 1 point for a draw, and no points for a loss. If two or more teams are equal on points, the following criteria will be applied to determine the ranking in the group stage:

a one-game playoff;
superior goal difference;
draw of lots.

First round
Eight teams were drawn into two groups of three and one group of two. In each group, teams played against each other home-and-away. The top team in each group advanced to the Semifinals. Santos, the title holders, had a bye to the next round.

Group 1

Group 2

Group 3

Knockout stage

Bracket
 
Four teams were drawn into two groups. In each group, teams played against each other home-and-away. The top team in each group advanced to the Finals.

Group A

Group B

Finals

Champion

Top goalscorers

Footnotes

A. Not played after Millonarios (already eliminated) preferred paying a fine of USD 4,500 rather than traveling to Rio for the match; points awarded to Botafogo but no goals.

External links
Copa Libertadores 1963 at CONMEBOL website
Copa Libertadores 1963 at RSSSF

1
Copa Libertadores seasons